Werner Widmayer (17 May 1909 – 14 June 1942) was a German footballer.

Personal life
Serving as an Oberleutnant in the German army, Widmayer died on 14 June 1942 in Semenivka, Ukraine during World War II at the age of 33.

References

1909 births
1942 deaths
Sportspeople from Kiel
Footballers from Schleswig-Holstein
Association football midfielders
German footballers
Germany international footballers
Holstein Kiel players
German Army personnel killed in World War II
German Army officers of World War II
Military personnel from Kiel